Cumières is a commune in the Marne department in north-eastern France.

Twin towns
Cumières is twinned with:

  Felino, Italy
  Assesse, Belgium

See also
Communes of the Marne department
Montagne de Reims Regional Natural Park

References

Communes of Marne (department)